Calicium sequoiae is a crustose lichen that has only been found growing on old-growth redwood trees in California. It is a species of pin lichen (genus Calicium) in the family Caliciaceae. Apothecia are white-powder coated (pruinose). The unusual spores have spiral ridges.

The thallus reacts to chemical tests as K+ yellow, P+ orange, and the apothecia reacts I+ blue.

In 2021, Calicium sequoiae was assessed for the global IUCN Red List. Because of ongoing declines in the extent and quality of habitat and inferred ongoing declines in the extent of occurrence, it has been assessed as an endangered species.

References

sequoiae
Lichen species
Lichens described in 2008
Lichens of the Southwestern United States
Taxa named by Leif Tibell